Sinoseius lobatus is a species of mite in the family Ameroseiidae.

References

External links

 

Ameroseiidae